Tina Faichnie (also known as Tina Margaretis) is a former association football player who represented New Zealand at international level.

Faichnie made a single appearance for Football Ferns in a 1–0 win over Australia on 8 October 1979.

References

Year of birth missing (living people)
Living people
New Zealand women's international footballers
New Zealand women's association footballers
Women's association footballers not categorized by position